Temuri Ketsbaia (born 18 March 1968) is a Georgian former professional football player and current manager. He is the current manager of the Cyprus national team.

Club career
After beginning his professional career in 1987 in his native Georgia with Dinamo Tbilisi, Ketsbaia then played for Cypriot side Anorthosis, and Greek giants AEK Athens.

His career in AEK started with a great misfortune, since in his first official match against Rangers, for the UEFA Champions League qualifiers, he seriously injured his hand. He returned after a few months, but his performance in his first season was not as expected, clearly affected by both the injury and his adaptation to a more demanding league. He was the only scorer in the league derby against Olympiacos in the away win on 19 November 1994. The following season he won the cup with AEK, while impressing with his performance. He was even named by his colleagues in the league as the best foreign footballer of the season. On 28 September 1995 he scored against Sion for the UEFA Cup Winners' Cup. In the semi-finals he scored in both legs against Panathinaikos. His next season he helped AEK a lot to play beautiful football, winning the Greek Super Cup and add another Greek Cup to their trophy case. On 17 October 1996 he opened the score in the 0–2 win against Olimpija Ljubljana for the round of 16 of the UEFA Cup Winners' Cup.

He ran down his contract in the Greek capital and arrived at St James' Park and Newcastle United on a free transfer in 1997. Early in his career with The Magpies, Ketsbaia scored a goal in extra time against Croatia Zagreb, ensuring a place for Newcastle United in the UEFA Champions League for the first time in their history.

In England, he is remembered for his celebration after scoring a last-minute winner against Bolton Wanderers in 1998, in which he took off his jersey and kicked the advertising hoardings. He stated that this was to relieve his frustration at being kept out of the Newcastle starting line-up.

Although he was considered something of a 'cult hero' by Newcastle fans, he was sold to Wolverhampton Wanderers in 2000, and also played for Dundee, among others.

On 30 June 2007, Ketsbaia announced his retirement from professional football. His last match before retiring was held on 14 July.

In May 2015, Ketsbaia played for Dundee versus Crystal Palace as part of Julián Speroni's testimonial match, along with former Dundee players Georgi Nemsadze, Juan Sara, Fabián Caballero and Luis Alberto Carranza.

International career
He won the Malta International Football Tournament whilst on international duty with Georgia in 1998, the only International honour in his career.

Managerial career
In January 2004, while still a player for Anorthosis, Ketsbaia took his first managerial position in Anorthosis, winning two championships, in 2004–05 and in 2007–08, and one cup in 2006–07. In 2005 Anorthosis reached in the third-round of the Champions League, over running Trabzonspor in the second round, and in 2008–09 reached in the UEFA Champions League Group Stage, the first Cypriot team to do so.

On 28 September 2008, he stated his interest for the vacant Newcastle manager position. In an interview with the Sunday Mirror, he said: "I had a great opportunity to play at Newcastle as a player, so why not as a manager?"

In the week before the match club directors had gone to the police complaining of financial irregularities being carried out by the club President who was forced to resign, despite support from Ketsbaia and club supporters.

In April 2009, Ketsbaia stood down as coach of Anorthosis. On 25 May 2009, the chairman of Olympiacos announced that Ketsbaia had been appointed the club's manager on a three-year deal, replacing Ernesto Valverde; however, on 15 September 2009, Ketsbaia and Olympiacos parted company following early criticism from the club's supporters, despite Olympiakos not conceding a goal during his tenure.

In November 2009 he was announced as manager of the Georgian national side, which he represented 49 times as a player. He claimed that while he could not promise a major tournament in the near future, the team would fight to reach one.

In January 2015, Ketsbaia once again declared his interest in taking over the vacant manager job at Newcastle United, after Alan Pardew moved on to Crystal Palace, however, John Carver was appointed in a temporary position instead.

On 28 August 2015, Ketsbaia agreed terms with reigning Cypriot champions APOEL, signing a two-year contract with the club and replacing Domingos Paciência who was fired earlier at the same day. On 21 April 2016, one day after APOEL's elimination in the Cypriot Cup semi-finals by Apollon Limassol, Ketsbaia's contract with APOEL was terminated, although at that moment the team were four points clear at the top of the league with only four matches remaining.

On 6 June 2016, Ketsbaia took over the management at Greek powerhouse AEK Athens, a club he played for until 1996, on a two-year contract. His overall defensive managing mentality prevented the club from playing exciting football. On 19 October 2016, two weeks after a heavy away 3-0 defeat to Olympiacos, the AEK board decided to terminate Ketsbaia's contract with immediate effect, something that Ketsbaia attributed to a premeditated sacking plan by the board, which amongst others involved slanderous press publications targeting Ketsbaia. The Georgian manager, apparently disturbed by the 'unlawful behaviour' of the club's administration in the employment termination process, filed a lawsuit on 10 December 2016 demanding a sum of approximately £350k to be shared among him and his backroom staff; Ketsbaia was eventually entitled to a sum of just under £100k plus legal taxes following the examination of the case. In an interview for the Cypriot branch of Alpha TV, Ketsbaia accused the Greek sport journalism sector of deliberately misrepresenting true facts in favour of certain teams and board members, and AEK of underestimating his managerial abilities for no apparent reason; he even added that certain AEK board members were hoping for a loss against Larisa in order to justify his imminent sacking.

On 1 June 2017, he was hired as the manager of the Russian club FC Orenburg. On 17 August 2017,The president of FC Orenburg, Vasily Stolypin, said that Temuri Ketsbaia left the post of head coach not because of sports results. He left the mutual consent of the parties and personal affairs, the family.

On June 1, 2019, he returned to Anorthosis and "A. Papadopoulos". He was the coach of the Famagusta team for the second time, finishing in the 2nd place of the championship in the 2019-20 season, which was stopped prematurely due to the coronavirus, equaling with the 1st Omonia, which the team would have faced in the semifinals of the cup. In the 2020-21 season he finished in 4th place and won the cup. In the period 2021-22, Anorthosis finished in 5th place and was excluded from the institution of the cup in the semifinal phase by Omonia.

Participated in the Europa League qualifiers in 2020-21 and 2021-22. In 2021-22 he also qualified for the Europa Conference groups. He finished in 3rd place in the group behind Gent and Partizan and in front of Flora.

On June 6, 2022, he was announced by the management of Anorthosis that he is a past member of the team. The reason was his insistence on keeping his associates on the bench, disagreeing with the terms set by the Athletic Director and management.

Career statistics

International goals
Georgia score listed first, score column indicates score after each Ketsbaia goal.

Managerial statistics

Honours

As a player
Dinamo Tbilisi
Umaglesi Liga: 1990, 1991

AEK Athens
Greek Cup: 1995–96, 1996–97
Greek Super Cup: 1996

Anorthosis
Cypriot First Division: 2004–05
Cypriot Cup: 2002–03

As a manager
Anorthosis
Cypriot First Division: 2004–05, 2007–08
Cypriot Cup: 2006–07, 2020–21
Cypriot Super Cup: 2007

Individual
Georgian Footballer of the Year:1990, 1997
Best Foreign Player: 1995–96

References

External links
 
 Where are they now – Temuri Ketsbaia
 

1968 births
Living people
People from Gali District, Abkhazia
Footballers from Abkhazia
Mingrelians
Association football midfielders
Soviet footballers
Footballers from Georgia (country)
Georgia (country) international footballers
FC Dinamo Tbilisi players
Anorthosis Famagusta F.C. players
AEK Athens F.C. players
Newcastle United F.C. players
Wolverhampton Wanderers F.C. players
Dundee F.C. players
Cypriot First Division players
Super League Greece players
Premier League players
English Football League players
Scottish Premier League players
Football managers from Georgia (country)
Anorthosis Famagusta F.C. managers
Olympiacos F.C. managers
Georgia national football team managers
APOEL FC managers
Expatriate football managers in Cyprus
Expatriate footballers from Georgia (country)
Expatriate footballers in Cyprus
Expatriate footballers in Greece
Expatriate footballers in England
Expatriate footballers in Scotland
Expatriate sportspeople from Georgia (country) in Cyprus
Expatriate sportspeople from Georgia (country) in Greece
Expatriate sportspeople from Georgia (country) in England
Expatriate sportspeople from Georgia (country) in Scotland
AEK Athens F.C. managers
Expatriate football managers in Russia
FC Orenburg managers
Expatriate sportspeople from Georgia (country) in Russia
FA Cup Final players